The Eric Bana Show Live was an Australian television comedy and talk show hosted by and named after Eric Bana.

The show began as four hour-long specials in 1996 called Eric. In 1997, the show settled into a weekly half-hour slot and was renamed The Eric Bana Show Live. It featured celebrity guests, music, comedy sketches and comedy monologues. Steven Blackburn was the band leader.

Bana began his career as a comedian in the sketch comedy series Full Frontal and brought many of his characters over to this show.

See also
List of Australian television series

References

External links

Australian comedy television series
Australian television talk shows
Australian variety television shows
Seven Network original programming
Television shows set in Victoria (Australia)
1997 Australian television series debuts